Toria Union is a union parishad of Atwari Upazila, Panchagarh District, Rangpur Division, Bangladesh. There are 11 villages and 9 mouzas in the union.

References

External links
 

Unions of Atwari Upazila
Unions of Panchagarh District
Unions of Rangpur Division